Tesan (also Romanized as Tesān) is a village in Godeh Rural District, in the Central District of Bastak County, Hormozgan Province, Iran. At the 2006 census, its population was 41, in 7 families.

References 

Populated places in Bastak County